Ivan Yakovlevich Vishnyakov (Russian: Ива́н Я́ковлевич Вишняко́в; 1699,  in Moscow – 1761, in Saint Petersburg) was a Russian portrait painter and muralist in the Rococo style.

Life and works 
He was briefly apprenticed to be a varnisher, then was sent to the "Канцелярия от строений" (Chancellory of Buildings) in 1727, where he studied under Louis Caravaque, a French portrait painter living in Russia, and Andrey Matveyev. He qualified as a master painter in 1739 and became head of the Chancellory after Matveyev's early death.

He painted murals in many of the palaces and churches of Saint Petersburg and its suburbs, including the Summer Palace, the Anichkov Palace and the Winter Palace. He also did portraits and icons, restored paintings and appraised the works of foreign artists. His portraits were among the first to depart from the flat, static style favored at the Imperial Court. Among his best-known students were Alexei Antropov, Alexei Ivanovich Belsky and Ivan Firsov.

In 1740, he attained the rank of Court Counselor (a civil ranking equal to lieutenant-colonel) and, in 1752, became a Collegiate Assessor, which entitled him to be addressed as "Your Excellency".

Other notable portraits

References

Further reading 
 Uspensky, А.: Словарь художников, в XVIII веке писавших в императорских дворцах (Dictionary of Artists in the 18th Century). (1913).
 Lebedev, G.:Русская живопись первой половины XVIII века (Russian Painting in the First Half of the 18th Century) (1938).
 Ilina, Т. V.: Иван Яковлевич Вишняков: Жизнь и творчество (Ivan Yakovlevich Vishnyakov: Life and Work) Искусство (1979)

External links 

 RusArtNet: Brief biography
 ArtCyclopedia: Works by Vishnyakov online
 Иконы письма Ивана Яковлевича Вишнякова в иконостасе Андреевской церкви в Киеве. 1751-1752 Icons by Vishnyakov

1699 births
1761 deaths
18th-century painters from the Russian Empire
Russian male painters